Álvaro Marinho (born 15 March 1976) is a Portuguese sailor. Together with Miguel Nunes he competed in the 470 at four Olympics from 2000 to 2012. His best result was at the 2000 Summer Olympics where he finished fifth.

References

External links
 

1976 births
Living people
Portuguese male sailors (sport)
Olympic sailors of Portugal
Sailors at the 2000 Summer Olympics – 470
Sailors at the 2004 Summer Olympics – 470
Sailors at the 2008 Summer Olympics – 470
Sailors at the 2012 Summer Olympics – 470
Place of birth missing (living people)